Sarrag-e Khvajaveh (also Romanized as Sarrag-e Khvājaveh; also known as Sarrak-e Khvājavī) is a village in Dehdez Rural District, Dehdez District, Izeh County, Khuzestan Province, Iran. At the 2006 census, its population was 428, in 79 families.

References 

Populated places in Izeh County